This article is a catalog of actresses and models who have appeared on the cover of Harper's Bazaar Australia, the Australian edition of Harper's Bazaar magazine, starting with the magazine's first issue in March 1998.

1998

1999

2000

2001

2002

2003

2004

2005

2006

2007

2008

2009

2010

2011

2012

2013

2014

2015

2016

2017

2018

2019

2020

External links
 Harper's Bazaar Australia
 Harper's Bazaar Australia on Models.com

Australia